Carlos Patino (born 18 August 1995) is a Colombian professional soccer player who last played for Canadian club Cavalry FC.

Playing career

Kitsap Pumas
Patino played for PDL side Kitsap Pumas in the 2015 season.  He made 10 appearances for the club and helped lead them to a Northwest Division title.

Seattle Sounders 2
On 4 September 2015, Patino signed a professional contract with USL club Seattle Sounders FC 2.  He made his professional debut a day later in a 2–1 defeat to Austin Aztex.

Vänersborgs IF
In August 2017, Patino signed with Swedish side Vänersborgs IF. He departed the club at the end of the season in October.

Calgary Foothills
Patino spent the 2018 season with USL PDL side Calgary Foothills FC. He would go on to win the PDL Championship that season with the club..

Cavalry FC
On 23 January 2019 Patino signed with Canadian Premier League side Cavalry FC.

Honours

Club

Calgary Foothills
PDL Championship: 2018

Calvary FC 
 Canadian Premier League Finals 
Runners-up: 2019
Canadian Premier League (Regular season): 
Champions: Spring 2019, Fall 2019

References

External links
Kitsap Pumas bio

1995 births
Living people
Association football midfielders
Colombian footballers
Sportspeople from Valle del Cauca Department
Colombian expatriate footballers
Expatriate soccer players in the United States
Colombian expatriate sportspeople in the United States
Expatriate footballers in Sweden
Vancouver Whitecaps Residency players
FC Edmonton players
Kitsap Pumas players
Tacoma Defiance players
Calgary Foothills FC players
Cavalry FC players
USL League Two players
USL Championship players
Canadian Premier League players